Kyrkliga Folkpartiet ( or Popular Party) was a minor pro-fascist party in Sweden founded in 1930. The party was formed and led by Ivar Rhedin, a priest in the Church of Sweden. Rhedin was the editor of Göteborgs Stiftstidning (Magazine of the Diocese of Gothenburg), in which he wrote many pro-German articles. The party was an ally of the main Nazi party in Sweden, National Socialist Workers Party. But the cooperation between the two parties did not last. Although both groups were staunch antisemites, their approaches toward the Jews were somewhat different. Rhedin, as a conservative Christian, was against the Jews as a religious community. NSAP were against the Jews as a race. Rhedin had no problem in accepting Jews who converted to Christianity, whereas NSAP and other nazi groups considered that converted Jews continued to be Jews in racial aspects. The party was closed down in 1936.

References

1930 establishments in Sweden
1936 disestablishments in Sweden
Defunct Christian political parties
Defunct political parties in Sweden
Political parties established in 1930
Political parties disestablished in 1936
Protestant political parties